Churchill Lake 193A is an Indian reserve of the Birch Narrows Dene Nation in Saskatchewan.

References

Indian reserves in Saskatchewan
Division No. 18, Saskatchewan